Contemporary worship music (CWM), also known as praise and worship music, is a defined genre of Christian music used in contemporary worship. It has developed over the past 60 years and is stylistically similar to pop music. The songs are frequently referred to as "praise songs" or "worship songs" and are typically led by a "worship band" or "praise team", with either a guitarist or pianist leading. It has become a common genre of music sung in many churches, particularly in charismatic or non-denominational Protestant churches with some Roman Catholic congregations incorporating it into their mass as well.

History and development

In the early 1950s, the Taizé Community in France started to attract youths from several religious denominations with worship hymns based on modern melodies.

In the mid-20th century, Christian Unions in university environments hosted evangelistic talks and provided biblical teaching for their members, Christian cafés opened with evangelistic aims, and church youth groups were set up. Amateur musicians from these groups began playing Christian music in a popular idiom. Some Christians felt that the church needed to break from its stereotype as being structured, formal and dull to appeal to the younger generation. By borrowing the conventions of popular music, the antithesis of this stereotype, the church restated the claims of the Bible through Christian lyrics, and thus sent the message that Christianity was not outdated or irrelevant. The Joystrings were one of the first Christian pop groups to appear on television, in Salvation Army uniform, playing Christian beat music.

Churches began to adopt some of these songs and the styles for corporate worship. These early songs for communal singing were characteristically simple. Youth Praise, published in 1966, was one of the first and most famous collections of these songs and was compiled and edited by Michael Baughen and published by the Jubilate Group.

As of the early 1990s, songs such as "Lord, I Lift Your Name on High", "Shine, Jesus, Shine" and "Shout to the Lord" had been accepted in many churches. Integrity Media, Maranatha! Music and Vineyard were already publishing newer styles of music. Supporters of traditional worship hoped the newer styles were a fad, while younger people cited , "Sing to the Lord a new song". Prior to the late 1990s, many felt that Sunday morning was a time for hymns, and young people could have their music on the other six days. A "modern worship renaissance" helped make it clear any musical style was acceptable if true believers were using it to praise God. The changes resulted from the Cutting Edge recordings by the band Delirious?, the Passion Conferences and their music, the Exodus project of Michael W. Smith, and the band Sonicflood. Contemporary worship music became an integral part of Contemporary Christian music.

More recently songs are displayed using projectors on screens at the front of the church, and this has enabled greater physical freedom, and a faster rate of turnover in the material being sung. Important propagators of CWM over the past 25 years include Vineyard Music, Hillsong Worship, Bethel Music, Elevation Worship, Jesus Culture and Soul Survivor.

Theology and lyrics
As CWM is closely related to the charismatic movement, the lyrics and even some musical features reflect its theology. In particular the charismatic movement is characterised by its emphasis on the Holy Spirit, through a personal encounter and relationship with God, that can be summed up in agape love.

Lyrically, the informal, sometimes intimate, language of relationship is employed. The terms 'You' and 'I’ are used rather than 'God' and 'we', and lyrics such as, 'I, I'm desperate for You', and 'Hungry I come to You for I know You satisfy, I am empty but I know Your love does not run dry' both exemplify the similarity of the lyrics of some CWM to popular love songs. Slang is used on occasion (for example 'We wanna see Jesus lifted high') and imperatives ('Open the eyes of my heart, Lord, I want to see You'), demonstrating the friendly, informal terms charismatic theology encourages for relating to God personally. Often a physical response is included in the lyrics ('So we raise up holy hands'; 'I will dance, I will sing, to be mad for my king'). This couples with the use of drums and popular rhythm in the songs to encourage full body worship.

The metaphorical language of the lyrics is subjective, and therefore does risk being misinterpreted; this emphasis on personal encounter with God does not always balance with intellectual understanding.

Just as in secular, popular and rock music, relationships and feelings are central topics, so in CWM, association to a personal relationship with God and free expression are emphasised.

As in traditional hymnody, some images, such as captivity and freedom, life and death, romance, power and sacrifice, are employed to facilitate relationship with God.

The modern hymn movement 
Beginning in the 2010s, contemporary worship music with a distinctly theological lyric focus blending hymns and worship songs with contemporary rhythms & instrumentation, began to emerge, primarily in the Baptist, Reformed, and more traditional non-denominational branches of Protestant Christianity. Artists in the modern hymn movement include well-known groups such as modern hymn-writers, Keith & Kristyn Getty, and Sovereign Grace Music as well as others including Matt Papa, Enfield (Hymn Sessions), and Aaron Keyes. By the late 2010s, the format had gained sizable traction in many churches and other areas in culture as well as being heard in CCM collections and musical algorithms on several internet streaming services.

Musical identity
Because, in common with hymns, such music is sung communally, there can be a practical and theological emphasis on its accessibility, to enable every member of the congregation to participate in a corporate act of worship. This often manifests in simple, easy to learn melodies, in a mid-vocal range, repetition, familiar chord progressions and a restricted harmonic palette. Unlike hymns, the music notation may primarily be based around the chords, with the keyboard score being secondary.

At more charismatic services, members of the congregation may harmonise freely during worship songs, perhaps singing in tongues (see glossolalia), and the worship leader seeks to be 'led by the Holy Spirit'. There may also be role of improvisation, flowing from one song to the next and inserting musical material from one song into another.

Performance

The worship band

There is no fixed band set-up for playing CWM, but most have a lead singer and lead guitarist or keyboard player. Their role is to indicate the tone, structure, pace and volume of the worship songs, and perhaps even construct the order or content during the time of worship. Some larger churches are able to employ paid worship leaders, and some have attained fame by worship leading, blurring contemporary worship music with Christian rock, though the role of the band in a worship service, leading and enabling the congregation in praise normally contrasts that of performing a Christian concert. In CWM today there will often be three or four singers with microphones, a drum kit, a bass guitar, one or two guitars, keyboard and possibly other, more orchestral instruments, such as a flute or violin. There has been a shift within the genre towards using amplified instruments and voices, again paralleling popular music, though some churches play the same songs with simpler or acoustic instrumentation.

The role of technology
Technological advances have played a significant role in the development of CWM. In particular the use of projectors means that the song repertoire of a church is not restricted to those in a song book. Songs and styles go in trends. The internet has increased accessibility, enabling anyone to see lyrics and guitar chords for many worship songs, and download MP3 tracks. This has also played a part in the globalisation of much CWM. Some churches, such as Hillsong, Bethel and Vineyard, have their own publishing companies, and there is a thriving Christian music business which parallels that of the secular world, with recording studios, music books, CDs, MP3 downloads and other merchandise. The consumer culture surrounding CWM has prompted both criticism and praise, and as Pete Ward deals with in his book "Selling Worship", no advance is without both positive and negative repercussions.

Criticisms
Criticisms include Gary Parrett's concern that the volume of this music drowns out congregational participation, and therefore makes it a performance. He quotes Ephesians 5:19, in which Paul the Apostle tells the church in Ephesus to be 'speaking to one another with psalms, hymns and songs from the Spirit', and questions whether the worship band, now so often amplified and playing like a rock band, replace rather than enable a congregation's praise.

Seventh-day Adventist author Samuele Bacchiocchi expressed concerns over the use of the "rock" idiom, as he argues that music communicates on a subconscious level, and the often anarchistic, nihilistic ethos of rock stands against Christian culture. Using the physical response induced by drums in a worship context as evidence that rock takes peoples' minds away from contemplating on the lyrics and God, he suggests that rock is actively dangerous for the Church.

The theological content too has raised questions for some, including Martyn Percy, who argues there is too great an emphasis on a very intimate relationship with God, using terms such as 'I' and 'you' instead of 'we' and 'God', and very passionate, physical language, and argues that this bias needs urgent correction. He explains how the emphasis on emotion can encourage hype and a need to create an atmosphere which evokes a sense of encounter with God, rather than allowing God to do so.

The emphasis on praise, and on an interpretation of 'worship' that is overwhelmingly positive, can lead to avoidance of the psalms of lament. Michael Vasey writes: "Scripture is, of course, full of lament – and devotes its finest literary creation to warning the godly against quick and easy answers. The power of many of the psalms we are embarrassed to use lies precisely here. Of all this there is little echo in our contemporary reading." Whereas denominational churches generally use a weekly lectionary that gives a broad range of scriptural themes, including selected psalms on those themes, CWM churches tend not to have an agreed lectionary and the consequent agreement on using a broad range of material.

Pope John Paul II, concerning the role of music in regard to worship, wrote, "today, as yesterday, musicians, composers, liturgical chapel cantors, church organists and instrumentalists must feel the necessity of serious and rigorous professional training. They should be especially conscious of the fact that each of their creations or interpretations cannot escape the requirement of being a work that is inspired, appropriate and attentive to aesthetic dignity, transformed into a prayer of worship when, in the course of the liturgy, it expresses the mystery of faith in sound."

Some have noted that contemporary worship songs often reflect the social climate of individualism as the lyrics emphasize personal relationship with God, even within a group context.

Interviewed in Christianity Today in 2011, Grove City College professor T. David Gordon said contemporary music was not easier to sing or better than traditional music, but familiar. If this style of music was all people listened to, then that would make them happy. He also said praise bands had a hard time finding good music, but played the contemporary music because the church wanted it, with the only criteria being how contemporary the music sounded.  Gordon also said churches were adding hymns to contemporary services, but that in the past the main concern had never been how new the music sounded.

Gordon said in 2014 that contemporary music could not be as good because one generation could not compete with 50 generations of hymns, and even the contemporary songs were in some cases just the old hymns with an updated sound. Writers of new songs had a hard time with "theologically sound, but significant, profound, appropriate, memorable, and edifying". After his 2011 interview, Gordon said Mark Moring of Christianity Today had observed that contemporary music in churches was on the decline. Gordon said the people who first wanted it are older, and contemporary music had become so common that it was no longer a marketing tool, and no longer new when people wanted what was new. Praise teams, Gordon said, were like performers, but that they were in conflict with what the Bible said. And the congregation needed to participate.

Popularity

Some songs now appear in more traditional hymnals. Evangelical Lutheran Worship (published in 2006 by the Evangelical Lutheran Church in America) includes "Lord, I Lift Your Name on High" by Rick Founds and "Shout to the Lord" by Darlene Zschech. The United Methodist Hymnal (1989) includes "Thy Word Is a Lamp" by Amy Grant and "Take Our Bread" by Joe Wise.

Contemporary Christian worship groups, such as Hillsong United, are ranking in the top ten on Billboard and other national charts and are earning publicity in pop culture publications.

In 2019, the U.S. radio network Air1 (which was previously devoted to Christian hits) changed its format to focus primarily on worship music.

See also

 List of Christian worship music artists
 Christian liturgy

Citations

General references 
 Bacchiocchi, Samuele (ed.), The Christian and Rock Music: A Study on Biblical Principles of Music (Michigan, 2000)
 Darlington, Stephen, and Kreider, Alan (ed.), Composing Music for Worship (Norwich, 2003)
 Jones, Ian and Webster, Peter, "The theological problem of popular music for worship in contemporary Christianity", in Crucible. The journal of Christian social ethics (July–Sept 2006), pp. 9–16; full text in SAS-Space
 Miller, Donald, E., Postdenominational Christianity in the Twenty-First Century, Annals of the American Academy of Political and Social Science, Vol. 558, (July 1998), pp. 196–210
 
 Sheldon, Robin (ed.), In Spirit and in Truth: Exploring Directions in Music in Worship Today (London, 1989)
 
 Webster, Peter and Jones, Ian, "Expressions of Authenticity: Music for Worship" In: Redefining Christian Britain. Post 1945 perspectives. SCM, London, 2007,pp. 50–62; full text in SAS-Space
 Webster, Peter and Jones, Ian, "Anglican 'Establishment' reactions to 'pop' church music in England, 1956–c.1990". Studies in Church History, 42 (2006) . pp. 429–441; full text in SAS-Space
 Wilson-Dickson, Andrew, A Brief History of Christian Music, (Oxford, 1997)
 Wuthnow, Robert, All in Sync: How music and art are revitalising American Religion, (California, 2003)

 
Contemporary Christian music

de:Lobpreis und Anbetung#Neue Lobpreis- und Anbetungslieder